Galway United Football Club is an Irish association football club based in Galway. It is the women's section of the League of Ireland club Galway United. Since 2013–14 the club played in the Women's National League (WNL) and did so as Galway WFC until 2022. Throughout its existence the club has been closely associated with both the Galway Ladies League and the Galway Football Association. The WNL team had its origins in the Galway Ladies League representative team that won the 2007 FAI Women's Cup and then represented the Republic of Ireland in the 2008–09 UEFA Women's Cup. The Galway Ladies League and its member clubs, such as Salthill Devon, Galway Bohemians, Corrib Celtic, Colga F.C. and NUI Galway, served as a feeder system for Galway WFC.

History

2000s
During the 2000s, representative teams of women's leagues began to enter the FAI Women's Cup. In 2006 a team representing the Galway Ladies League were semi-finalists, losing after extra time and penalties to UCD. A team representing the Mayo Ladies League subsequently defeated UCD in the final. In 2007 the Galway Ladies League reached the final with a team that included Niamh Fahey, Méabh De Búrca and Julie-Ann Russell. All three were also playing for Salthill Devon. On 14 October 2007 at Dalymount Park, Galway defeated a Raheny United team that included Niamh Reid Burke and Olivia O'Toole. Fahey's penalty in the 75th minute gave the Galway Girls a 1–0 win. In 2008 Galway were FAI Women's Cup semi-finalists, losing 2–1 to Peamount United. In 2009 they were beaten 3–2 in the second round by St. Catherine's.

2008–09 UEFA Women's Cup
As a result of winning the 2007 FAI Women's Cup, Galway qualified to represent the Republic of Ireland in the 2008–09 UEFA Women's Cup. They were drawn in Group A9 along with Zürich, Universitet Vitebsk and SFK Sarajevo. The competition format saw Galway travel to Sarajevo in September 2008 to play in a mini-tournament to decide who would progress to the next round. With a squad that included Méabh De Búrca and Julie-Ann Russell, Galway finished second after beating the pre-tournament favourites, Universitet Vitebsk.

Women's National League 
In June 2013 the Football Association of Ireland announced Galway as an expansion team for the upcoming 2013–14 Women's National League season. Republic of Ireland women's national football team manager Susan Ronan welcomed the addition of Galway for helping make the league more national. The 2013–14 Galway WNL squad included several veterans of the 2008–09 UEFA Women's Cup campaign including Susie Cunningham, Melissa Casserly and Becky Walsh. Former Galway United manager Don O'Riordan was appointed manager of the women's club in June 2014, replacing Nigel Keady who had overseen the first season.

Galway United
In September 2022 Galway WFC announced that it would "reluctantly" withdraw from the following season's Women's National League: "We hope that other individuals or entities will take up the mantle to continue the tradition of senior and underage women's football in Galway in 2023." The local League of Ireland club Galway United released a statement on 5 October 2022 confirming that they would take over the running of Galway's women's teams for 2023. Phil Trill, who had been Alan Murphy's assistant with Galway WFC in 2022, was appointed as the new head coach. He hoped to secure the bulk of the existing playing squad for the following season.

Current squad

Notable players

Republic of Ireland women's internationals

Managerial history
 2013–2014: Nigel Keady
 2014–2016: Don O'Riordan
 2017–2021: Billy Clery
 2021: Stephen Lally
 2022: Alan Murphy

Honours
FAI Women's Cup
Winners: 2007: 1

References

External links
 
 
 WNL page

 
Women
Women's association football clubs in the Republic of Ireland
Association football clubs in County Galway
Association football clubs in Galway (city)
Women's National League (Ireland) teams